Hélio de Oliveira e Silva (28 May 1926 – 3 August 2006), also known as Paluca, was a Brazilian Olympic backstroke swimmer, who participated at one Summer Olympics for his native country.

At the 1948 Summer Olympics in London, he swam the 100-metre backstroke, reaching the semifinals.

Silva died in Niterói on 3 August 2006, at the age of 80.

References

1926 births
2006 deaths
20th-century Brazilian people
Brazilian male backstroke swimmers
Swimmers at the 1948 Summer Olympics
Olympic swimmers of Brazil